Jonathan Groth (born 9 November 1992) is a Danish table tennis player. He competed at the 2016 Summer Olympics in the men's singles event, in which he was eliminated in the third round by Ma Long. He is currently ranked in the top 20 of the World Rankings.

References

1992 births
Living people
Danish male table tennis players
Olympic table tennis players of Denmark
Table tennis players at the 2016 Summer Olympics
Table tennis players at the 2015 European Games
Table tennis players at the 2019 European Games
European Games medalists in table tennis
European Games silver medalists for Denmark
Table tennis players at the 2020 Summer Olympics
21st-century Danish people